The Optare Delta was a single-decker bus body manufactured by Optare on the DAF SB220 chassis. They were built in a factory in Leeds, England. They are known for their distinctive sloping front window. A common feature about the bus that it has a distinctive one-piece windscreen with a sloped windowline and a separately mounted destination display.

History
Announced in early 1988, the first Delta was launched at the British International Motor Show at the National Exhibition Centre in October 1988. The first was delivered in February 1989. A total of 324 were produced with British Airways purchasing 49, Trent Barton 43, London Regional Transport 35, Reading Buses 20 and Northern General 19. Production of the Delta ceased in 1999.

In popular culture
An Optare Delta in all-over red livery is featured as a driveable vehicle in the PlayStation 2 game The Getaway, and its sequel The Getaway: Black Monday.

References

External links

Bus Lists on the Web - DAF SB220

Full-size buses
Delta
Single-deck buses
Step-entrance buses
Vehicles introduced in 1988